Georgia's 22nd Senate District elects one member of the Georgia Senate. Its current representative for the 2019–20 session  is Democrat Harold V Jones.

References

External links

Georgia Senate districts